The La's is the only studio album by English rock band the La's, released on 1 October 1990 by Go! Discs. It included "There She Goes", the group's biggest hit, and "Timeless Melody". A deluxe edition of The La's was released on 7 April 2008. In 2013, NME ranked The La's at number 153 on its list of the 500 greatest albums of all time.

Release and reception

The La's was released in 1990 on Go! Discs in the United Kingdom and in 1991 on London Records in the United States. The album was praised by critics and embraced by fans. It was the result of nearly three years in the studio with a string of acclaimed producers. Each attempted to capture the sound sought by Lee Mavers, the lead singer and principal songwriter of the band. However, due to Mavers' exacting expectations, the sound eluded each of the producers, and the album eventually released was immediately disowned by the band.

Legacy
In 2013, NME ranked The La's at number 153 on its list of the 500 greatest albums of all time. In 2016, Rolling Stone placed the record at number 13 on its list of the "40 Greatest One-Album Wonders". The La's was also included in the book 1001 Albums You Must Hear Before You Die. Noel Gallagher of Oasis named it as one of his 13 favourite albums.

Track listing

Bonus tracks

The La's – Deluxe Edition (2008)
Disc 1 tracks 1–12 per original release

Personnel

The La's
 Lee Mavers – lead vocals and backing vocals, guitars
 John Power – basses and backing vocals
 Peter "Cammy" Camell – lead guitars
 Neil Mavers – drums and tambourine
 John "Boo" Byrne – electric guitar (on "There She Goes")
 Chris Sharrock – drums and tambourine (on "There She Goes")
 Paul Hemmings – electric guitar (on "Way Out")
 John "Timmo" Timson – drums, tambourine and bells(on "Way Out")

Production
 Steve Lillywhite – producer, mixing
 Mark Wallis – additional producer, engineer
 Donal Hodgson – engineer (on "Looking Glass")
 Bob Andrews – producer (on "There She Goes")
 Dave Charles – engineer (on "There She Goes")

Additional personnel
 Ryan Art – design

The La's: Deluxe Edition personnel
 Barry Sutton – guitar (disc one: tracks 13–18, disc two: tracks 1–13, 20)
 Chris Sharrock – drums (disc one: tracks 13–18, disc two: tracks 1–13, 18–20)
 Paul Hemmings – guitar (disc two: tracks 14–15)
 John "Timmo" Timson – drums (disc two: tracks 14–15)
 Peter "Cammy" Camell – guitar (disc two: tracks 16–17)
 Iain Templeton – drums (disc two: tracks 16–17)
 John "Boo" Byrne – guitar (disc two: tracks 18–19)

The La's: Deluxe Edition production personnel
 Mike Hedges – producer, remastering (disc two: tracks 1–13)
 Ian Grimble – engineer, mixing (disc two: tracks 1–13)
 Kevin Metcalfe – remastering (disc two: tracks 1–13)
 John Porter – producer (disc two: track 14)
 Kenny Jones – engineer (disc two: track 14)
 Gavin MacKillop – producer (disc two: track 15)
 Andy MacDonald – remixing (disc two: track 15)
 John Leckie – producer (disc two: tracks 16–17)
 Barry Hammond – engineer (disc two: tracks 16–17)
 Mike Shepherd – engineer (disc two: tracks 16–17)
 Bob Andrews – producer (disc two: tracks 18–19)
 Dave Charles – engineer (disc two: tracks 18–19)
 Jeremy Allom – producer (disc two: track 20)
 Mike Haas – engineer (disc two: track 20)

Chart performance

References

External links
 
 

 The La's at YouTube (streamed copy where licensed)

1990 debut albums
albums produced by Steve Lillywhite
The La's albums